Trachypepla importuna is a moth of the family Oecophoridae first described by Edward Meyrick in 1914. It is endemic to New Zealand. Adults have been collected in the North Island in January but the species is regarded as being poorly known.

Taxonomy 
This species was first described by Edward Meyrick in 1914 using specimens collected by George Hudson in January at Ohakune and Wellington. Hudson discussed this species in his book The butterflies and moths of New Zealand. The lectotype specimen, collected at Ohakune, is held at Natural History Museum, London.

Description
Meyrick described this species as follows:

Distribution
This species is endemic to New Zealand. In Wellington it is regarded as being local and uncommon.

Behaviour 
Adults of this species are on the wing in January. It is regarded as being poorly known.

References 

Moths described in 1914
Oecophoridae
Taxa named by Edward Meyrick
Moths of New Zealand
Endemic fauna of New Zealand
Endemic moths of New Zealand